The men's road race at the 1973 UCI Road World Championships was the 40th edition of the event. The race took place on Sunday 2 September 1973 in Barcelona, Spain. The race was won by Felice Gimondi of Italy.

Final classification

References

Men's Road Race
UCI Road World Championships – Men's road race
1973 Super Prestige Pernod